This is a list of women writers who were born in Lithuania or whose writings are closely associated with that country.

A
Gintarė Adomaitytė (born 1957), journalist 
Loreta Anilionytė, philosopher, educator, non-fiction writer, novelist, since 2000 
Yemima Avidar-Tchernovitz (1909–1998), Lithuanian-born Hebrew children's writer
Magdalena Avietėnaitė (1892–1984), journalist, diplomat and a public figure

B
Ona Baliukonė (1948–2007), poet, essayist, painter

C
Laura Sintija Černiauskaitė (born 1976), playwright, novelist
Birutė Ciplijauskaitė (born 1929), scholar, translator

G
Ona Galdikaitė (1898–1990), Lithuanian nun, poet and dissident writer, theological translator
Marija Gimbutas (1921–1994), Lithuanian-American translator, non-fiction writer, writings in German and English on archaeology, Lithuanian culture
Emma Goldman (1869–1940), Lithuanian-born Russian-American memoirist, autobiographer, publisher, anarchist
Aldona Gustas (born 1932), Lithuanian-born German-language poet, illustrator, feminist, works translated into several languages

H
Esther Hautzig (1930–2009), Lithuanian-born American, author of the autobiographical work The Endless Steppe

I
Jurga Ivanauskaitė (1961–2007), novelist, short story writer, poet, essayist, some works translated into English

J
Vidmantė Jasukaitytė (born 1948), poet, novelist, short story writer, essayist
Vanda Juknaitė (born 1949), playwright, novelist, memoirist

K
Ugnė Karvelis (1935–2002), novelist, translator, publisher, editor

L
Marija Lastauskienė (1872–1957), novelist, short story writer, journalist, frequently writing jointly with her sister under the pen name Lazdynų Pelėda, wrote in Polish and Lithuanian
Meilė Lukšienė (1913–2009), writings on education and Lithuanian culture

M
Edita Mildažytė (born 1966), journalist, talk show host
Miriam Mosessohn (1841–1920), Lithuanian-born Hebrew-language translator of German novels

N
Salomėja Nėris, pen name of Salomėja Bačinskaitė-Bučienė (1904–1945), acclaimed poet

P
Gabrielė Petkevičaitė-Bitė (1861–1943), journalist, novelist, short story writer, playwright
Sofija Pšibiliauskienė (1867–1926), wrote jointly with her sister Marija Lastauskienė under the pen name Lazdynų Pelėda, journalist, short story writer, novelist, usually writing in Polish
Paulina Pukytė (born 1966), artist, poet, essayist, critic

R
Giedra Radvilavičiūtė (born 1960), journalist, short story writer
Undinė Radzevičiūtė (born 1967), novelist, worked in advertising

S
Kristina Sabaliauskaitė (born 1974), art historian, historical novelist, short story writer
Šatrijos Ragana (Witch of Šatrija), pen name of Marija Pečkauskaitė (1877–1930), short story writer, novelist, translator
Ieva Simonaitytė (1897–1978), historical novelist, works often subjected to Soviet censorship

V
Laima Vaitkunskienė (born 1936), archaeologist
Indrė Valantinaitė (born 1984), poet, singer

Z
Žemaitė, pen name of Julija Beniuševičiūtė-Žymantienė (1845–1921), novelist, short story writer

See also
List of Lithuanians
List of women writers

References

-
Lithuanian
Writers
Writers, Women